is a Japanese actress, voice actress and singer. Some of her prominent anime roles include Kotomi Ichinose in Clannad, Rin in Inuyasha, Kotori Monou in X, Aoi Kannazuki in Kaitō Tenshi Twin Angel, Durandal in Honkai Impact 3rd, Haruka Nogizaka in Nogizaka Haruka no Himitsu, UMP9 in Girls' Frontline, Fiel Nirvalen in No Game No Life, Sawako Kuronuma in Kimi ni Todoke, and Satellizer L. Bridget in Freezing. Noto was nominated in the 1st Seiyu Awards for her work as Yakumo Tsukamoto in School Rumble and as Masane Amaha in Witchblade. Noto has released several character songs and albums which have charted in Oricon and was a guest at the Otakon and Anime Expo conventions held in the United States.

Biography
Noto was born in Ishikawa Prefecture, Japan. After graduating from Baba Elementary School in Kanazawa City in 1992, she entered Kanazawa City Koshomachi Junior High School. In 1995, Noto entered Hokuriku Gakuin High School. After graduating from high school in 1998, Noto attended Yoyogi Animation Gakuin for a year, after which she became a trainee at the Osawa office. There, she was in charge of the script for episode 21 of the UHF anime, Tōka Gettan, first broadcast in April 2007.

Noto was introduced as a person from her hometown of Ishikawa Prefecture in the morning edition of the Hokkoku Shimbun column, "In the distance," dated April 7, 2008.

Noto agreed to appear as a voice actress in the seventh volume of Haruka Nogizaka's Secret. The scene where she encounters Haruka at the CD release event is depicted with the impression that "the voice and characters are similar to Haruka." In volume nine, she reappears as "N's" and depicts the workplace and the scene of accepting autograph requests.

Career

Voice acting
Noto's voice has been described as a "whisper voice" and a "healing voice". Yasunori Honda commented, "There is no such thing as a muddy voice. This is a place that was born with a natural nature and is a little out of the ordinary, isn't it?"

Since the mid-2000s, Noto has been increasingly in charge of narration. Her voice is heard in promotional commercials such as for Mitsubishi Electric, Kewpie Corporation, and "Avocado.com". Aside from commercials, she is also in charge of the anime Inadvertently Penelope and the DVD The Scottish Fold Brothers: Atom & Luke.

Noto supervised the use of the Kanazawa dialect in Hanasaku Iroha, which is set in Noto's home of Ishikawa Prefecture. It has been noted that Noto requested her parents' cooperation, and in the staff roll of the seventh episode, "People of the Noto family" are credited as supervisors of the Kanazawa dialect.

Music
Noto sang  in the anime series Witchblade.

On November 23, 2011, Glory Heaven released Noto's debut single, "Ao no Kiseki". The OP / ED theme of the radio "Mamiko Noto / Earth NOTE", for which she is a personality, was recorded by her. Before that, she released the CD "Scoop! / 7 days after" in collaboration with Ayako Kawasumi, who often co-stars at the same office.

Personal life
Noto announced her marriage on September 14, 2018. Noto announced the birth of her first child on February 1, 2019.

Filmography

Anime

Film

Video games

Tokusatsu

Dubbing roles

Discography

Albums

Singles

Drama CDs

Notes

References

External links

  
 
 

1980 births
Living people
People from Kanazawa, Ishikawa
Japanese stage actresses
Japanese video game actresses
Japanese voice actresses
Japanese women pop singers
Musicians from Ishikawa Prefecture
Voice actresses from Ishikawa Prefecture
20th-century Japanese actresses
21st-century Japanese actresses
21st-century Japanese women singers
21st-century Japanese singers